Paul Michel Audiard (15 May 1920 – 27 July 1985) was a French screenwriter and film director, known for his witty, irreverent and slang-laden dialogues which made him a prominent figure on the French cultural scene of the 1960s and 1970s. He was the father of French film director Jacques Audiard.

Screenwriting filmography

1940s–1950s 

1949 :
 Mission à Tanger, directed by André Hunebelle
 On n'aime qu'une fois, directed by Jean Stelli
1950 :
 Brune ou blonde, directed by Jacques Garcia
 Beware of Blondes, directed by André Hunebelle
1951 :
 Vedettes sans maquillage, directed by Jacques Guillon
 Une histoire d'amour, directed by Guy Lefranc
 Le Passe-muraille, directed by Jean Boyer
 Darling Caroline, directed by Richard Pottier
 Ma femme est formidable (uncredited), directed by André Hunebelle
 Massacre en dentelles, directed by André Hunebelle
 L'Homme de ma vie, directed by Guy Lefranc
 Bim le petit âne, directed by Albert Lamorisse
1952 :
Adorables Créatures (uncredited), directed by Christian-Jaque
 Pour vous, mesdames (uncredited), directed by Jacques Garcia
 Elle et moi, directed by Guy Lefranc
 Le Feu quelque part, directed by Pierre Foucaud (Court-métrage)
 Le Duel à travers les âges, directed by Pierre Foucaud (Court-métrage)
1953 :
 Les Dents longues, directed by Daniel Gélin
 Les Trois Mousquetaires, directed by André Hunebelle
 The Most Wanted Man, directed by Henri Verneuil
1954 :
 Destinées (uncredited), directed by Christian-Jaque, Jean Delannoy and Marcello Pagliero
 Sang et lumières, directed by Georges Rouquier
 Les Gaietés de l'escadron, directed by Paolo Moffa
 Poisson d'avril (1954), directed by Gilles Grangier
 Quay of Blondes, directed by Paul Cadéac
 , directed by Pierre Foucaud
1955 :
 Gas-Oil, directed by Gilles Grangier
1956 :
 Jusqu'au dernier, directed by Pierre Billon
 Blood to the Head, directed by Gilles Grangier
 Mannequins of Paris, directed by André Hunebelle
 Short Head, directed by Norbert Carbonnaux
1957 :
 Le rouge est mis, directed by Gilles Grangier
 Fugitive in Saigon, directed by Marcel Camus
 Three Days to Live, directed by Gilles Grangier
 Retour de manivelle, directed by Denys de La Patellière
 Maigret tend un piège, directed by Jean Delannoy
1958 :
 Les Misérables, directed by Jean-Paul Le Chanois
 Le Désordre et la Nuit, directed by Gilles Grangier
 Les Grandes Familles, directed by Denys de la Patellière
 Marchands de rien, directed by Daniel Lecomte (court-métrage)
1959 :
 Le fauve est lâché (uncredited), directed by Maurice Labro
 Archimède le clochard, directed by Gilles Grangier
 Pourquoi viens-tu si tard?, directed by Henri Decoin
 Maigret et l'Affaire Saint-Fiacre, directed by Jean Delannoy
 125, rue Montmartre, directed by Gilles Grangier
 Rue des prairies, directed by Denys de la Patellière
 Babette s'en va-t-en guerre, directed by Christian-Jaque
 Eyes of Love, directed by Denys de la Patellière
 Vel d'Hiv', directed by Guy Blanc (Court-métrage)
 La Bête à l'affût, directed by Pierre Chenal
 Péchés de jeunesse, directed by Louis Duchesne

1960s 

1960 :
Le Baron de l'écluse, directed by Jean Delannoy
 La Française et l'amour, film à sketches, « L'Adultère », directed by Henri Verneuil
 Les Vieux de la vieille, directed by Gilles Grangier
 Spécial Noël : Jean Gabin (TV), directed by Frédéric Rossif
 Le Président, directed by Henri Verneuil
1961 :
 Taxi for Tobruk, directed by Denys de la Patellière
 Les lions sont lâchés, directed by Henri Verneuil
 Les Amours célèbres - sketch « Les Comédiennes », directed by Michel Boisrond
 Le cave se rebiffe, directed by Gilles Grangier
 Le Bateau d'Émile, directed by Denys de la Patellière
1962 :
 Un singe en hiver, directed by Henri Verneuil
 The Gentleman from Epsom, directed by Gilles Grangier
 Le Diable et les Dix Commandements, directed by Julien Duvivier
 Le Voyage à Biarritz (uncredited), directed by Gilles Grangier
1963 :
 Mélodie en sous-sol, directed by Henri Verneuil
 Carambolages, directed by Marcel Bluwal
 Les Tontons flingueurs, directed by Georges Lautner
 Teuf-teuf (TV), directed by Georges Folgoas
 Des pissenlits par la racine, directed by Georges Lautner
 Cent mille dollars au soleil, directed by Henri Verneuil
1964 :
 Marcia Nuziale, directed by Marco Ferreri
 Les Barbouzes, directed by Georges Lautner
 Une foule enfin réunie, directed by Monique Chappelle (short movie)
 Un drôle de caïd or Une souris chez les hommes, directed by Jacques Poitrenaud
 Par un beau matin d'été, directed by Jacques Deray
 La Chasse à l'homme, directed by Edouard Molinaro
1965 :
 La Métamorphose des cloportes, directed by Pierre Granier-Deferre (scenario co-written with Albert Simonin, from Alphonse Boudard)
 Quand passent les faisans, directed by Edouard Molinaro
 Les Bons Vivants, directed by Gilles Grangier & Georges Lautner
 The Dictator's Guns (uncredited), directed by Claude Sautet
 , directed by Georges Lautner
1966 :
 Tendre Voyou, directed by Jean Becker
 Un idiot à Paris, directed by Serge Korber
 Sale temps pour les mouches, directed by Guy Lefranc
 Johnny Banco, directed by Yves Allégret
1967 :
 Le Pacha, directed by Georges Lautner
 All Mad About Him, directed by Norbert Carbonnaux
 Max le débonnaire (TV show), directed by Gilles Grangier, Yves Allégret and Jacques Deray
 , directed by Georges Lautner
 La Petite Vertu, directed by Serge Korber
1968 :
 , directed by Georges Lautner
 Leontine
1969 :
 Sous le signe du taureau, directed by Gilles Grangier

1970s 

1973 :
Baxter!, directed by Lionel Jeffries
1974 :
How to Do Well When You're a Jerk and a Crybaby
  (uncredited), directed by Claude Vital
1975 :
 Incorrigible, directed by Philippe de Broca
1976 :
 Le Grand Escogriffe, directed by Claude Pinoteau
 Le Corps de mon ennemi, directed by Henri Verneuil
1977 :
 , directed by Philippe de Broca
 Mort d'un pourri, directed by Georges Lautner
 L'Animal, directed by Claude Zidi
1978 :
 , directed by Philippe de Broca
1979 :
 Flic ou voyou, directed by Georges Lautner
 Les Égouts du paradis, directed by José Giovanni
 La Fabuleuse histoire de Roland-Garros, directed by Charles Gérard
 Le Guignolo, directed by Georges Lautner
 On a volé la cuisse de Jupiter, directed by Philippe de Broca

1980s 

1980 :
 Le Coucou, directed by Francesco Massaro
 L'Entourloupe, directed by Gérard Pirès
 , directed by Robert Enrico
1981 :
Le Professionnel, directed by Georges Lautner
 Garde à vue, directed by Claude Miller
 Est-ce bien raisonnable ?, directed by Georges Lautner
1982 :
 Espion, lève-toi, directed by Yves Boisset
1983 :
Mortelle randonnée, directed by Claude Miller
 Vive la sociale !, directed by Gérard Mordillat
 Le Marginal, directed by Jacques Deray
1984 :
 Canicule, directed by Yves Boisset
 Les Morfalous, directed by Henri Verneuil
1985 :
On ne meurt que deux fois, directed by Jacques Deray from the novel of Robin Cook
 La Cage aux folles III, « Elles » se marient, directed by Georges Lautner.

Directing filmography
Leontine  (1968)
 A Golden Widow (1969)
 Elle boit pas, elle fume pas, elle drague pas, mais... elle cause ! (1970)

See also 
 Chantons sous l'Occupation, a documentary film

External links

1920 births
1985 deaths
Writers from Paris
French film directors
French male screenwriters
20th-century French screenwriters
20th-century French male writers